The Ninoy Aquino International Airport Expressway (NAIAX), signed as E6 of the Philippine expressway network, is an  elevated expressway in Metro Manila, Philippines, which links the Skyway to Ninoy Aquino International Airport and Entertainment City. Traversing the cities of Pasay and Parañaque, the NAIAX runs along Andrews Avenue, Electrical Road, and NAIA Road connecting the Skyway to Ninoy Aquino Avenue, Macapagal Boulevard, New Seaside Drive and the Manila–Cavite Expressway.

The expressway is the first airport expressway in the Philippines. It opened in September 2016. It traverses the cities of Pasay and Parañaque.

Route description 

From the Sales Interchange (NAIA Exit) of Skyway, the expressway heads to the southwest and runs along Sales Road across Villamor Airbase and Newport City. It then curves to the northwest on Andrews Avenue towards the entrance to NAIA Terminal 3 and continues along the northern perimeter of the airport towards Electrical Road near NAIA Terminal 4. From here, it makes a turn to the south and runs along Parañaque River, parallel to Domestic Road on the east towards the NAIA Road junction. From this junction, the expressway branches into two, with one traversing eastwards to NAIA Terminals 1 and 2, while the other continues westwards to Entertainment City and the Manila–Cavite Expressway.

Features

The expressway is operated and maintained by Skyway Operations & Maintenance Corporation (SOMCo), the same company that operates Skyway, while its concession holder is SMC NAIAX Corporation (formerly Vertex Tollways Development, Inc.); both companies are subsidiaries of San Miguel Corporation.

Lanes 

Prior to the opening of the Skyway expansion project (by eliminating shoulders and shrinking the median) in 2020 that resulted in a grand total of 7 lanes, and due to the lack of right of way available for the project, NAIAX is the second expressway that does not have a shoulder, after North Luzon Expressway between Balintawak to Balagtas (Tabang Interchange) following widening to four lanes as a heavily traveled segment, and the first expressway having a narrow concrete barrier as median. Even though SMC claims that NAIAX is a 4-lane elevated expressway, in fact, SMC via its subsidiary, Vertex Tollways Development, has built 5 to 7 lanes on the expressway without shoulders and with a narrow median barrier, with the configurations listed below.

5-lane zones 
 2 lanes to Macapagal Boulevard/NAIA Interchange (catering to motorist to/from NAIA Terminal 1 and 2) and 3 lanes to Skyway for (1) half part of the expressway's Parañaque River alignment and (2) the alignment from NAIA Terminal 3 exit (+/-  before the exit) to Andrew Ave off-ramp; the first part is configurated to tackle the possible traffic jam by the merging of NAIAX from the airport and Macapagal Boulevard
 3 lanes to NAIA Interchange and 2 lanes to Skyway for another half part of the river alignment and above Airport Road to NAIA Terminal 3 Exit
 2 lanes to NAIA Interchange and 3 lanes to Macapagal Boulevard west of NAIA Interchange

7-lane zones 
These zones are actually 5 lanes with an acceleration lane for each direction to cater vehicles transferring between interchanges that are so close to each other.
 from NAIA interchange to NAIAX-CAVITEX Interchange, where 4 lanes go westbound and 3 lanes go eastbound (to NAIA)
 from Skyway to Andrews Avenue off-ramp, where 4 lanes go westbound (to NAIA) and 3 lanes go eastbound

Speed limit 
The expressway has an overhead speed gantry so drivers can see the speed they cruise on; the gantry itself is located near the eastbound off-ramp to NAIA 3.

History 

On July 17, 2001, President Gloria Macapagal Arroyo and her Cabinet approved the construction of the NAIA Expressway, which would be funded through a Japanese loan package, and construction of its interchange with Skyway began on March 17, 2004. Construction of the  NAIA Expressway Phase 1 (NAIA Terminal 3 Exit of Skyway) was completed and inaugurated on May 30, 2009. It provided an entry/exit ramp to the then newly-opened NAIA Terminal 3 and Resorts World Manila.

Phase 2 of the NAIA Expressway project was approved by the Benigno Aquino III Administration on May 30, 2012. It included a  extension of the expressway all the way to Macapagal Boulevard in Entertainment City, Parañaque via Andrews Avenue, Electrical Road (west of Domestic Road) and NAIA Road. The project was funded through a public-private partnership (PPP) scheme, with San Miguel Corporation winning the bidding for its construction, operation and maintenance. On January 2, 2014, construction began on Phase 2 of the NAIA Expressway. On September 22, 2016 at exactly 12:01 AM (PST), the second phase of the airport expressway from Macapagal Boulevard to NAIA Terminals 1 and 2 was opened to all motorists and airport passengers rushing to their flights in order to avoid the traffic lights at every intersection along NAIA Road. Toll collection at the NAIAX begun on October 22, exactly one month after the opening of the airport tollway.

On November 28, 2016, the on-ramp of the expressway's western terminus was removed as the new on-ramp in the expressway was opened last November 4.

On December 21, 2016 at exactly 6:00 AM (PST), the Entertainment City-NAIA Road-SLEX-Skyway segment (including the access ramp to Terminal 3) of the airport expressway was opened to all motorists for the Christmas rush. On December 28, 2016, the access ramps to and from Manila–Cavite Expressway (CAVITEX) were also opened to all motorists to provide easier access from the province of Cavite and Las Piñas to NAIA Terminals 1, 2 and 3 and vice versa.

On June 1, 2017, NAIAX was fully opened to all motorists. By the full-opening of NAIAX, CAVITEX is ultimately connected to Skyway, as well as the international airport. Since the opening of Skyway Stage 3 in 2020, the airport is connected to the North Luzon Expressway (NLEX), with Skyway and NAIAX providing seamless travel to and from the airport, including Clark International Airport in Angeles City.

Future expansion
San Miguel Corporation proposed an expansion of the expressway all the way to Bonifacio Global City, Taguig in 2017. Planned to traverse above Lawton Avenue, this expansion aims to reduce traffic along Sales Road and Sales Interchange and help reduce travel time from the airport to BGC to 10 minutes from the current 30 minutes to 1 hour. The project also includes constructing additional NAIAX ramps from the NAIA Terminals 1 and 2 exit ramps to C-5 Road Extension via Ninoy Aquino Avenue. This project is part of SMC's three-year expansion project of all toll roads in southern Metro Manila to decrease traffic congestion on the area's major thoroughfares. Currently, the project is awaiting approval from the Philippine government.

Tolls 

The expressway uses a barrier toll system, where toll collection is done at toll barriers on a fixed rate, based on vehicle class and distance travelled using it. The eastbound lanes of NAIAX employ toll collection at exit points and its main toll plaza in front of NAIA Terminal 3, while the westbound lanes employ toll collection on entry points, at its main toll plaza, and upon exit to Andrews Avenue. The expressway uses the AutoSweep RFID electronic toll collection system, shared with Skyway, SLEX, STAR Tollway, MCX and TPLEX.

NAIAX rates (July 2017 – present)

Skyway system rates (September 22, 2016 – July 2017)

Exits

References 

Toll roads in the Philippines
Roads in Metro Manila